Datuk Zahidi bin Zainul Abidin (Jawi: زاهدي بن زين العابدين; born 9 January 1961) is a Malaysian politician who served as the Deputy Minister of Communications and Multimedia for the second term in the Barisan Nasional (BN) administration under former Prime Minister Ismail Sabri Yaakob and former Minister Annuar Musa from August 2021 to the collapse of the BN administration in November 2022 and the first term in the Perikatan Nasional (PN) administration under former Prime Minister Muhyiddin Yassin and former Minister Saifuddin Abdullah from March 2020 to the collapse of the PN administration in August 2021, Chairman of the Rubber Industry Smallholders Development Authority (RISDA) from 2015 to 2018, Member of the Perlis State Executive Council (EXCO) in the BN state administration under former Menteri Besar Shahidan Kassim from 1999 to 2006, Member of Parliament (MP) for Padang Besar from May 2013 to November 2022. He is a member of the National Trust Party (AMANAH), a component party of the Pakatan Harapan (PH) coalition and was a member of the United Malays National Organisation (UMNO) and its Padang Besar division chief. He is also the Chairman of the Malaysian International Institute of Islamic Cooperation (IKIAM).

Zahidi received his Diploma in Public Administration from Institut Teknologi MARA (Universiti Teknologi MARA). Zahidi joined the AMANAH by submit his membership form to AMANAH on 4 February 2023 although he had revealed on 30 January 2023 that he planned to join another PH component party the People's Justice Party (PKR).

Political offices
Zahidi has held various positions in politics and UMNO:

Controversies
In September 2020, Zahidi caused a nationwide outrage when he falsely accused a Sabahan foundation student named Veveonah Mosibin from Universiti Malaysia Sabah of trying to popularise her YouTube channel when she posted a video of her in a hut on top of a tree struggling to take an exam. Veveonah at the time had to stay home due to Malaysia's Movement Control Order (MCO) to stop the COVID-19 outbreak in the country and had to go on top of tree to get signal for internet connection. Zahidi was later made to apologise for his inaccurate remark in Dewan Negara and informed that it was Abdul Rahim Bakri of Kudat MP who told him that Veveonah did not have exams on the day she uploaded the video, of which, later clarified otherwise by the university's chairman, Masidi Manjun.

The aftermath of the incident had brought Zahidi's academic credentials under spotlight for purportedly dubious academic qualification while Veveonah's hometown district got 13 new telecommunication towers expeditiously installed with 4G connection under the JENDELA program.

Personal life
In January 2021, Zahidi was tested positive for COVID-19 and sent to Sungai Buloh Hospital for treatment. He was discharged after 11 days.

Election results

Honours

Honours of Malaysia
 :
  Companion Class I of the Exalted Order of Malacca (DMSM) – Datuk (2003)

References

External links
 

Living people
1961 births
Place of birth missing (living people)
People from Perlis
Malaysian people of Malay descent
Malaysian Muslims
Former United Malays National Organisation politicians
Independent politicians in Malaysia
National Trust Party (Malaysia) politicians
Members of the Dewan Rakyat
Members of the Perlis State Legislative Assembly
21st-century Malaysian politicians